The Table of Ranks was a formal list of positions and ranks in the military, government, and court of Imperial Russia. Peter the Great introduced the system in 1722 while engaged in a struggle with the existing hereditary nobility, or boyars. The Table of Ranks was formally abolished on 11 November 1917 by the newly established Bolshevik government. During the Vladimir Putin  presidency a similar formalized structure has been reintroduced into many governmental departments, combined with formal uniforms and insignia: Local Government, Diplomatic Service, Prosecution Service, Investigative Committee.

Principles
The Table of Ranks re-organized the foundations of feudal Russian nobility (mestnichestvo) by recognizing service in the military, in the civil service, and at the imperial court as the basis of an aristocrat's standing in society. The table divided ranks in 14 grades, with all nobles regardless of birth or wealth (at least in theory) beginning at the bottom of the table and rising through their service (sluzhba) to the tsar. While all grades were open by merit, promotion required qualification for the next rank, and grades 1 through 5 required the personal approval of the tsar himself. Despite initial resistance from noblemen, many of whom were still illiterate in the 18th century and who shunned the paper-pushing life of the civil servant, the eventual effect of the Table of Ranks was to create an educated class of noble bureaucrats.

Peter's intentions for a class of nobles bound to the tsar by their personal service to him were watered down by subsequent tsars. In 1762 Peter III abolished the compulsory 25-year military or civilian service for nobles.  In 1767 Catherine the Great bought the support of the bureaucracy by making promotion up the 14 ranks automatic after seven years regardless of position or merit. Thus the bureaucracy became populated with time servers.

Achieving a certain level in the table automatically granted a certain level of nobility. A civil servant promoted to the 14th grade gained personal nobility (dvoryanstvo), and holding an office in the 8th grade endowed the office holder with hereditary nobility. Nicholas I raised this threshold to the 5th grade in 1845.
In 1856 the grades required for hereditary nobility were changed to the 4th grade for the civil service and to the 6th grade for military service. The father of Vladimir Lenin progressed in the management of education, reaching the 4th rank and becoming an "active state councillor" (действительный статский советник), which gave him the privilege of hereditary nobility.

With occasional revisions, the Table of Ranks remained in effect until the Russian Revolution of 1917.

Table of Ranks 
An abridged version of the Table of Ranks with time expiration set for promotion is shown below:

The table below contains the military ranks of the Guards (infantry and cavalry) 1722 until 1917.

Peter I stipulated that "princes related to us or married to our princesses always take precedence" and that when military officers of the army and navy were of the same rank, "the naval officer is superior at sea to the land officer; and on land the land officer is superior to the naval officer".  He laid down that fines of two months' salary should be assessed against those falsely claiming a higher rank or gaining a rank without qualification. He stated that service with a foreign monarch would not automatically confer the rank until approved by the tsar, as "we do not grant any rank to anyone until he performs a useful service to us or to the state", while women were to "advance in rank with their husbands".

Style of address 
In a way the government, court, military and clergy ranks represented the gentry class of the Russian Empire. Similarly to the noble titles, the rank holders each had their specific style of address:

Outside that table are the rank of Generalissimus, which was an honorary title and not a military rank and the title of Patriarch, which theoretically equaled the eminence of the Russian Emperor, but which Peter the Great kept vacant between 1700 and 1720 and eventually substituted for the collective board of the Most Holy Synod, effectively turning the Church into a department of the state.

First complete translation into English
The first complete translation into English of the original Table of Ranks promulgated by Peter the Great in 1722 was presented by Brazilian historian Angelo Segrillo in 2016, and is available online.

See also
 Wohlgeboren
 List of Japanese court ranks, positions and hereditary titles
 History of Russian military ranks

Notes

References

External links 
 
  Table of Ranks
Peter I's original Table of Ranks

Government reform of Peter the Great
Civil service ranks